Makhmud Bedalovich Umarov (10 September 1924 – 25 December 1961) was a Kazakhstani sport shooter. He competed in the 50 m pistol event at the 1956 and 1960 Olympics and won a silver medal on both occasions.

References

1924 births
1961 deaths
Sportspeople from Almaty
Kazakhstani male sport shooters
Soviet male sport shooters
ISSF pistol shooters
Olympic shooters of the Soviet Union
Shooters at the 1956 Summer Olympics
Shooters at the 1960 Summer Olympics
Olympic silver medalists for the Soviet Union
Olympic medalists in shooting
Medalists at the 1956 Summer Olympics
Medalists at the 1960 Summer Olympics